ThreatConnect is a cyber-security firm based in Arlington, Virginia. They provide a Threat Intelligence Platform for companies to aggregate and act upon threat intelligence.

History
The firm was founded in 2011 as Cyber Squared Inc. by Adam Vincent, Richard Barger, Andrew Pendergast and Leigh Reichel. They renamed to ThreatConnect after their series A funding of $4 million in 2014, and in December 2015 obtained series B funding of $16 million.

The company gained attention when it linked the Anthem medical data breach to Chinese government-sponsored entities. According to cybercrime expert Brian Krebs, ThreatConnect identified domains used by the group that were intentionally similar to legitimate domains used by Anthem.

They also linked Guccifer 2.0, responsible for the 2016 Democratic National Committee email leak, to the Russian-backed cyberespionage group Fancy Bear. Further cyberattacks they attributed to Fancy Bear include against a group investigating the Malaysia Airlines 17 crash, and the World Anti-Doping Agency who had recently issued a report about state-sponsored doping.

In September 2020, ThreatConnect acquired Virginia-based software company Nehemiah Security.

References

External links
 

Computer security companies
American companies established in 2011
Organizations associated with Russian interference in the 2016 United States elections